Prof. H. Emil Salim, MA, Ph.D. (born in Lahat, South Sumatra, Indonesia, 8 June 1930) is an Indonesian economist and former politician. Born of Minangkabau parents, both from the village of Koto Gadang in West Sumatra. His uncle is Agus Salim, one of the founding fathers of the Republic of Indonesia and Minister of Foreign Affairs in the early 1950s.

Salim graduated from the Faculty of Economics of the University of Indonesia in 1959. He obtained a PhD in economics from the University of California, Berkeley, and returned to Indonesia to a teaching position at the Faculty of Economics of the University of Indonesia in 1964. He became one of the well-known group of 'Berkeley Mafia' economic advisers, working closely with Professor Widjojo Nitisastro. In 1977 he was appointed to the position of professor of economic development at the University of Indonesia.

Salim has held a number of government positions, including:

1966: member of the team of economic advisers to President Suharto
1967-68: member of the team of advisers to the Minister of Manpower.
1967-1969: chairman of the technical team of the Council for Economic Stability and a member of the Gotong Royong Parliament.
1969: vice chairman of Bappenas (the National Development Planning Agency)
1971: Minister of State for the Improvement of the State Apparatus.
1973-1978: Minister of Transportation
1978-1983: Minister of State for Development Supervision and the Environment
1983-1993: Minister of State for Population and the Environment
2007-2010: member of the advisory council to President Yudhoyono, as the adviser for environment and sustainable development issues
2010-2014: chairperson, the advisory council to President Yudhoyono

Salim has chaired the Foundation for Sustainable Development and the Kehati Foundation, and co-chaired the United States-Indonesia Society. He is a member of the Association of Indonesian Moslem Intellectuals.

Extractive Industries Review 

In July 2001 the World Bank launched an independent inquiry called the Extractive Industries Review (EIR). The review was headed by Salim. Salim held consultations with a wide range of stakeholders in 2002 and 2003. The EIR recommendations were published in January 2004 in a final report entitled Striking a Better Balance. The report concluded that fossil fuel and mining projects do not alleviate poverty and recommended that World Bank involvement with these sectors be phased out by 2008 to be replaced by investment in renewable energy and clean energy. The World Bank published its Management Response to the EIR in September 2004. The EIR served to alter the World Bank's policies on oil, gas and mining. Following the EIR process, the World Bank also issued a revised Policy on Indigenous Peoples.

References
 reprinted as 'Emil Salim' in Thee Kian Wie (ed), 2003, Recollections: the Indonesian economy, 1950s - 1990s. Research School of Pacific and Asian Studies (RSPAS), Australian National University (ANU), Canberra, and Institute of Southeast Asian Studies, Singapore.  .

1930 births
Living people
Indonesian Muslims
Minangkabau people
University of Indonesia alumni
University of California, Berkeley alumni
People from Lahat Regency
Government ministers of Indonesia
Indonesian economists
Academic staff of the University of Indonesia
Environment ministers of Indonesia
Transport ministers of Indonesia